Aiolos Trikalon B.C. (alternate spellings: Aeolus, Trikala; Greek: Αίολος Τρικάλων), previously known for sponsorship reasons as Trikala Aries, was a Greek professional basketball club that is based in Trikala, Greece. The club is named after Aeolus.

Branding

History
The club was founded in 1993, under the name Aiolus Trikalon Basketball Club. During the 2008–09 season, Aeolus failed to achieve a promotion place in their league, and to qualify to the Greek B League (3rd-tier division on the Greek basketball pyramid). However, in the subsequent 2009–10 season, Aeolus managed to qualify.

In the next season, 2010–11, they finished in 9th place in the Greek B League. In 2012, the club changed its name to Trikala Basketball Club, abbreviated as Trikala B.C., and it then competed in the Greek Second Division, for the first time, during the 2012–13 season. In 2013, Greek company Aries became the official name sponsor of the team, and the team became known as Trikala Aries.

The club competed in the top-tier level Greek Basket League, for the first time, in the 2013–14 season. During their first season in the top level Greek League, Trikala finished in 11th place. Following the 2017–18 season, the team had financial difficulties and had to disband. The team returned for the 2018–19 season, once again under the club's original name of Aiolos Trikalon. In 2022 the club merged with Ikaros Trikala, ande the new club has the name Trikala Basket.

Arena
Trikala plays its home games at Trikala Municipal Sports Hall, which has a seating capacity of 2,500.

Season by season

Titles and honors

Domestic competitions
Greek 3rd Division
 Champions (1): (2011–12)

Greek 4th Division
 Champions (2): (2009–10, 2019–20)

Roster

Notable players

Greece
  Georgios Georgakis
  Michalis Giannakidis
  Sotiris Gioulekas
  Nikos Kaklamanos
  Nestoras Kommatos
  Marios Matalon
  Steve Panos
  Sofoklis Schortsanitis
  Georgios Tsiaras
  Alexandros Varitimiadis
  Kostas Vasileiadis

Europe
  Gilvydas Biruta
  Slaven Čupković
  Oleksandr Lypovyy
  Uroš Petrović
  Justin Robinson
  Ovie Soko
  Marko Tejić
 - Angelo Tsagarakis
  Hörður Vilhjálmsson
  Alexander Lindqvist

USA
  Kwame Alexander
  Kelsey Barlow
  Nate Bowie
  Brandon Brown
  Mike Caffey
  Demitrius Conger
  Alex Harris
  David Haughton
  Justin Ingram
  Paul Jones
  Lamond Murray Jr.
  D. J. Richardson

Rest of Americas
  Junior Cadougan
  Patrick Ewing Jr.
  Kentan Facey

Africa
  Kenny Kadji

Head coaches

Sponsorship names
For sponsorship reasons, the team has been known as:
Trikala Aries (2013–2018)

Other Sponsors
Gold Sponsor: Olympos
Official Sport Clothing Manufacturer: Adidas
Official Sponsor: Mikel Coffee Company
Official Supporter: Hondos Center

References

External links
Official Website 
Eurobasket.com Team Profile
Official YouTube Channel

Basketball teams in Greece
Basketball teams established in 1993
Sport in Trikala
1993 establishments in Greece